Vukoman Aračić (Serbian: Вукоман Арачић; 10 May 1850, in Lanište, Principality of Serbia – 12 February 1915, in Užice, Kingdom of Serbia) was a Serbian general. He was the hero of the Balkan Wars, winning the Battle of Knjaževac and the Siege of Vidin.

Biography 
He was born in the village of Lanište, Jagodina district, to father Petar and mother Stevana. He finished four grades of an elementary school in Jagodina and six grades of high school in Kragujevac in 1869. Then he went to the military academy - Artillery School of the Military Academy, as a student of its ninth grade, which he finished as the seventh in the rank of 20 cadets in 1874. He was in the class together with the celebrated General Božo Janković, the liberator of Kosovo in 1912, as well as General Leonid Solarević.

In the First Serbian-Turkish, he was an adjutant for the general staff affairs of the Timok Corps. While in the Second Serbian-Turkish War (1877-1878) he was the chief of staff of the Jagodina Brigade. Then, at the head of his countrymen, he entered the Niš Fortress, on 29 December 1877 (11 January 1878, according to the new calendar) and then took part in the battles on Samokov.

For the next two years, he held the rank of captain of the 2nd class and was an ordinance officer of the Šumadija Division. As a state cadet, Vukoman Aračić travelled to Vienna in 1880 to study engineering. He stayed there until 1882. Upon his return from Vienna, he served as Chief of Staff of the Engineering Regiment. He was transferred to the general staff profession of Captain I class in 1885, and immediately in the war against the Bulgarians, he became the chief of staff of the Drina Division of the 1st call. From that position, in October 1887, he was appointed commander of the 6th Infantry Battalion.

In April of the following year, he became the acting head of the External Department of the Operations Department of the General Staff. During the 1890s, he performed a number of duties at the central military administration. He was the Acting Chief of the Operations Department of the Ministry of War, the Deputy Chief of the General Staff, the Chief of the General Military Department of the Ministry of War and the Assistant Chief of Staff of the Active Army Command.

From 1890 to 1903 he was commander of the Danube divisional area, from March 1895 commander of the IX Infantry Regiment, chief of the operational department of the General Staff and commander of the IV command of the Šumadija divisional area, and from April 1902 Timok divisional area and honorary adjutant of King Alexander Obrenović. In the same period, from August 1901, he became a member of the Higher Military Council.

In the period 1893 to 1903, with minor interruptions, (from 12 September 1893 to 1 September 1896, then from 21 June 1897 to 1 March 1899 and from 26 March 1900 to 18 August 1901) was also a professor at the Military Academy. As a part-time and full professor, he taught Military Geography and History of War Skills at its lower level, and Tactics and General Staff Service with War Games at its higher course. In 1893 and 1901, he was also a member of the academic council of this institution. As president and member, he was also in the commissions for taking the non-commissioned officer and officer exams.

From October 1900 to October 1901, he was also the editor of the military magazine Ratnik. Briefly, during 1898, he also edited the Official Military Gazette. In 1895, he was also a member of the military court of cassation.

He wrote the books Oreography around our country on the Balkan Peninsula (1898) and the General Staff Service of the war (1899, COBISS.SR 167911948), and in 1914 he prepared for publication the work General Staff Service of the Peacetime, which was not printed due to the war.

He was one of the founders of the first equestrian club in Šumadija: the Šumadija Regional Riders' Circle Knez Mihailo Obrenović in 1898.

Balkan Wars
In 1912, at the dawn of the Balkan wars, he was activated as a reserve general staff colonel and re-appointed commander of the Timok divisional area. In the First Balkan War, his area did not have significant effects, but that is why the great commanding values came to full expression in the Second Balkan War in 1913, after the June raid of the Bulgarians on Bregalnica. Then he mobilized the people of the Timok Valley in Serbia and Bulgaria - the conscripts of the second and third vocations and the Last Defense (old men and young men). With the units thus formed on Planinka, on 23 and 24 June, he broke the onslaught of the Bulgarians and already on 2 July 1913, launched an attack. His units captured Kula and liberated Belgrade and stopped near the town of Vidin, which they besieged. For these successes of an operational nature, Colonel Vukoman Aračić was promoted to the rank of general on 1 November 1913 and returned to active duty, and the city of Zaječar declared him its honorary citizen. He was also decorated with the highest war decoration, Order of Karađorđe's Star with swords.

World War I
In World War I, Aračić successfully commanded the Timok Division of the Second Call and the Sumadija Division of the First Call, during the liberation of Šabac on 10 August 1914 and during the Cerska bitka (Battle of Cer). During the battle on Drina, the people of Timok inflicted heavy blows on the enemy on the bloody Parašnica.

Somewhat later, on 29 September 1914. General Aračić was appointed commander of the Užice army at the time Battle of the Drina. At its head, in October and November 1914, he fought at Senković, Paklinka, Točionik, Babjak, and Semeć. After penetrating eastern Bosnia and inflicting heavy losses on the enemy, these units were forced to withdraw for strategic reasons until Ovčarsko-kablarska klisura, and after the fall Čačak on 12 November 1914.

During Battle of Kolubara, he commanded the battles on the line: Varda - Veliki Prisedo - Kadinjača - Ponikve. The Užice army leaned its right-wing solidly on the left-wing of the First Army, so the counter-offensive of the Serbian army on that part of the front made excellent progress. Chasing the enemy, Aračić's troops managed to enter Užice on 29 November 1914. On the night between 2 and 3 December, the 17th Infantry Regiment was transferred from Ovčar to Kablar and was broken through the following night. The general, in very poor health, still managed to command the army that was on the ground where the memorial fountain is now, all the way to the Kamenica River.

After the victorious Battle of Kolubara, General Aračić was committed to creating the best possible conditions for the recovery of his soldiers who were infected with an epidemic known as spotted typhus. Fighting against that disease, which he also contracted himself from Austro-Hungarian prisoners of war and eventually died. On 12 February 1915, General Aračić died and was buried in Užice, and on 25 February 1925 with the highest state honors, his remains were transferred to the family tomb at Belgrade New Cemetery.

Legacy 
Novo Lanište got a railway station thanks to General Vukoman Aračić, which it still uses today.

The railway station itself was called Aračićevo in the period between the two world wars.

In 1937 in the village of Jančići, near Čačak, a memorial fountain with a bust of the general was erected, which still exists today.

Awards and decorations 
 Order of Miloš the Great, II class
 Royal Order of Karađorđe's Star with swords, IV class
 Order of the Cross of Takovo with swords, 5th class
 Order of the Cross of Takovo, II and III class
 Royal Order of the White Eagle, III and V class
 Silver Medal for Bravery
 Medal for Military Virtues (Kingdom of Serbia) 
 Silver Medal for Zealous Service (1913)
 Medal for Bravery
 Commemorative War Memorial of 1876-1878
 Russian -Order of St. Stanislaus with swords of the 3rd class
 Montenegro - Order of Prince Danilo I, 3rd class
 French - Order of the Legion of Honour

Bibliography of papers
  General Staff Service of the War , Part 1, Belgrade 1899. 
 "General Staff Service of Peacetime", part 2, (completed in 1914. unpublished).
 "Service in the headquarters of the Serbian army in peacetime", Ratnik, vol. 33 (1895), vol.1 (July), p. 56.
  Project for service in the headquarters of the Serbian army , Ratnik, book. 34 (1896), vol. 3 (March), p. 257.
  Mobilization and concentration of the army , Ratnik, vol. 36 (1897), vol. 1 (January), p. 1.
 "Nutrition and maintenance of the army in combat readiness during the war", Ratnik, vol. 37 (1897), vol. 5 (November), p. 561; book 37 (1897), vol. 6 (December), p. 727
  Report on French Corps and Army Maneuvers , Ratnik, vol. 37 (1897), vol. 5 (November), p. 545; book 37 (1897), vol. 6 (December), p. 689.
 "Orography around our country", Warrior, vol. 38 (1898), vol. 1 (January), p. 33; book 38 (1898), vol. 2 (February), p. 158.
 "Quick Determination" (translation), Official Military Gazette, 1883, p. 898-902, 927–932, 957–964, 1023–1028, 1097–1100, 1151–1156.

Literature 
  General Vukoman Aračić: Commander of the Uzice Army , [B. M.]: Printing House of the Supreme Command of the Operational Department, [1915], 
  Aračić, Vukoman , article - integral part, Aleksandar Ž. Zivotic, Belgrade, 2010 
  Lectures of the General Staff Service of Peace and War on our course of the Military Academy in the school year 1897/8 , Vukoman Aračić, Belgrade: Military Academy, 1898 
  Službeni vojni list , magazine, Belgrade: Državna štamparija,

References 

1850 births
1915 deaths